Hugo Bueno López (born 18 September 2002) is a Spanish professional footballer who plays as a defender for Wolverhampton Wanderers.

Career
In 2019, Bueno joined the youth academy of English Premier League side Wolverhampton Wanderers.

Bueno made his Premier League debut on 15 October 2022, as a late substitute in a 1–0 victory over Nottingham Forest.

International career 
On 26 February 2020, Bueno made his international debut at under-18's level for Spain in a 2–1 win against Denmark international friendly.

Career statistics

References

External links
 Profile at the Wolverhampton Wanderers F.C. website
 

2002 births
Association football defenders
Expatriate footballers in England
Living people
Spain youth international footballers
Spanish expatriate footballers
Spanish expatriate sportspeople in England
Spanish footballers
Wolverhampton Wanderers F.C. players
Premier League players
Twin sportspeople